USS Liscome Bay (ACV/CVE-56) was the second of fifty s built to serve the United States Navy during World War II. Launched in April 1943 and commissioned the following August, she was named for Liscome Bay in Dall Island in the Alexander Archipelago of Alaska. On 24 November 1943, her munitions were catastrophically detonated by a torpedo attack by the  while she was acting as the flagship of Carrier Division 24, which was supporting operations on Makin. She quickly sank with the loss of 644 men. Her loss is the deadliest sinking of a carrier in the history of the United States Navy.

Design and description

Liscome Bay was a Casablanca-class escort carrier, the most numerous type of aircraft carriers ever built, and designed specifically to be mass-produced using prefabricated sections, in order to replace heavy early war losses. She displaced  standard,  with a full load. She was powered by two Uniflow reciprocating steam engines which drove two shafts, providing  and enabling her to make . Her compact size necessitated the installment of an aircraft catapult at her bow, and there were two aircraft elevators to facilitate movement of aircraft between the flight and hangar deck: one each fore and aft.

One /38 caliber dual-purpose gun was mounted on the stern. Anti-aircraft defense was provided by eight Bofors  anti-aircraft guns in single mounts, as well as 12 Oerlikon  cannons, which were mounted around the perimeter of the deck. Casablanca-class escort carriers were designed to carry 27 aircraft, but the hangar deck could accommodate more. For example, during her only combat deployment, Operation Kourbash, she carried 11 FM-1 and five F4F-4 fighters, as well as nine TBM-1 and three TBM-1C torpedo bombers, for a total of 28 aircraft.

Construction
She was laid down on 12 December 1942, under a Maritime Commission contract, MCE hull 1137, by Kaiser Shipbuilding Company, Vancouver, Washington. She was launched on 19 April 1943; sponsored by Mrs. Clara Klinksick, wife of Rear Admiral Ben Moreell, the Chief of the Navy's Bureau of Yards and Docks. Originally, she was intended to be sent to the British Royal Navy under the name HMS Ameer. However, a change in plans resulted in the  USS Baffins being redesignated as Ameer in Liscome Bays place. She was named Liscome Bay on 28 June 1943, as part of tradition which named escort carriers after bays or sounds in Alaska. The vessel was assigned the hull classification symbol CVE-56 on 15 July 1943, and was commissioned on 7 August 1943. Captain Irving D. Wiltsie was the ship's first commander, and her crew was derived from the Bogue-class escort carrier USS Glacier, which had been ordered in July 1942 but was sent to the Royal Navy as part of the Lend-Lease program.

Service history
After being commissioned, Liscome Bay proceeded southwards towards San Diego, California, picking up and ferrying 60 aircraft from San Francisco on the way, arriving on 22 September 1943. For the next month, she engaged in training operations off the Southern California coast. On 11 October, she was designated as the flagship of Carrier Division 24, under the command of Rear Admiral Henry M. Mullinnix. On 14 October, she received her aircraft contingent, and on 21 October, she departed for Pearl Harbor, arriving a week later, on 27 October. She then conducted additional drills and training exercises off of Hawaii until early November, when she was assigned to the invasion fleet assembling for Operation Kourbash. As a member of Carrier Division 24, she departed from Pearl Harbor on 10 November as part of Task Force 52 commanded by Rear Admiral Richmond K. Turner, bound for the invasion of the Gilbert Islands. It was to be her first and last mission.

Liscome Bay was assigned to the naval forces supporting the invasion of Makin. The invasion bombardment announcing the first major U.S. naval thrust into the central Pacific began on 20 November at 5 a.m. Just 76 hours later, Tarawa and Makin Islands were both captured. Liscome Bays aircraft had played a vital role in the capture of Makin, providing close air support and bombing Japanese positions. In total, 2,278 sorties were conducted by the carrier task group in support of Operation Galvanic, which neutralized enemy airbases, supported U.S. Army landings and ground operations with bombing and strafing missions, and intercepted enemy aircraft. With the islands secured, U.S. naval forces began retiring. However, Liscome Bay stayed with the rest of her task force as Marines mopped up resistance on Butaritari Island.

Sinking
The invasion of the Gilbert Islands had caught the Japanese command by surprise. Admiral Mineichi Koga, in desperation, issued orders to recall four Japanese submarines southwest of Hawaii and five submarines near Truk and Rabaul to converge on the Gilberts. Of the nine Japanese submarines sent to sortie against the U.S. forces in the Gilberts, six were lost.

On 23 November, however, the submarine , commanded by Lieutenant Commander Sunao Tabata, arrived off Makin. Liscome Bay, as the guide for the group, was located dead center between the other ships. As collisions were deemed to be a greater risk to the ships than a potential submarine attack, the ships were not zig-zagging.

At 04:30 on 24 November, reveille was sounded in Liscome Bay. On 04:34, the destroyer  left to investigate a signal beacon, likely dropped from a Japanese plane. This resulted in a gap within Liscome Bays screen. At 04:36, the radar operators on New Mexico spotted a short-lived blip, which may have represented I-175 diving into position. Flight quarters was sounded at 04:50. The crew went to routine general quarters at 05:05, when flight crews prepared their planes for dawn launching. Thirteen planes, including one forward on the catapult, had been readied on the flight deck. These had all been fueled and armed. There were an additional seven planes in the hangar that were not fueled or armed. She had a large amount of munitions on board, stored below-decks. Meanwhile, the task group executed a turn to the northeast, which brought Liscome Bay to a course presenting her side to I-175. The Japanese submarine fired a spread of at least three Type 95 torpedoes towards the task force.

At about 05:10, a lookout on the starboard (right) side of Liscome Bay reported seeing a torpedo headed for the ship. The entire task force was rocked by the explosion, but no other ships were significantly damaged. A mushroom cloud erupted, rising thousands of feet above the wreck of Liscome Bay.

The detonation sheared off nearly the entire stern of the carrier, killing everyone behind the forward bulkhead of the aft engine room. Seawater quickly rushed into the gap, mixing with oil released from the hull. Both the hangar and flight decks were heavily damaged. Parts of the superstructure, including the radar antenna, collapsed onto the deck. The forward part of the hangar was immediately engulfed in flames, igniting the few remaining planes on the flight deck. Planes fell off the carrier's deck. Steam, compressed air, and fire-main pressure were lost throughout the ship. Fires on the flight deck caused ammunition within the burning aircraft and anti-aircraft guns to detonate, further complicating matters. The gasoline coated water surrounding Liscome Bay caught fire, hampering efforts by survivors to escape.

At 05:33, only 23 minutes after the explosion, Liscome Bay listed to starboard and sank; 53 officers and 591 enlisted men were killed, including Captain Irving Wiltsie, Rear Admiral Henry M. Mullinnix and Doris Miller. 12 Grumman TBM Avenger torpedo bombers, 7 Grumman FM-1 Wildcat fighters, and 4 Grumman F4F Wildcat fighters went down with Liscome Bay.

Rescue
When Liscome Bay detonated, the rest of the task group immediately conducted evasive maneuvers, scattering from her wreck. At 05:40, the destroyers ,  and  arrived at the oil slick to rescue survivors, but many of the men hauled up were dead or dying. At 06:10, the destroyer  spotted two torpedo wakes, one just  from the destroyer's hull. A radar operator on New Mexico detected an echo, and Hull was recalled to join  in dropping depth charges.  took Hulls place in picking up survivors. At 08:00, the search operation was concluded. Of the 916 crewmen aboard Liscome Bay, 644, including Wiltsie, Mullinnix, and Miller (Cook 3rd Class Doris Miller, see "Notable crew" below), went down with the ship, whilst 272 survived. Including those lost on Liscome Bay, U.S. casualties in the assault on Makin Island exceeded the strength of the entire Japanese garrison.

Aftermath

On Thanksgiving night, two of the survivors died, and were buried at sea. On 2 December, the navy announced that Liscome Bay had been sunk off Makin Island.

Over two months later, on 4 February 1944, I-175 was detected and sunk by the destroyer  and the destroyer escort , using their Hedgehog anti-submarine mortar.

Legacy
In the Chapel of St. Cornelius, located within Valley Forge Military Academy and College, two stained-glass windows, installed in 1965, act as a memorial to Liscome Bay. On the museum ship , a memorial plaque was installed in 1990 to the ship.

Notable crew
 John G. Crommelin: Chief of Staff of Carrier Division 24, politician
 †William H. Hollister & Richard J. Hollister: three brothers who served in the U.S. Navy who all died in 1943, two aboard Liscome Bay; namesake of destroyer USS Hollister (DD-788)
 Robert Keeton: Future legal scholar, United States District Judge
 †Doris Miller: First African-American to receive the Navy Cross, namesake of frigate USS Miller (FF-1091), and of USS Doris Miller (CVN-81), a Gerald R. Ford-class aircraft carrier scheduled to be laid down in 2026 and launched in 2029.
 †Henry M. Mullinnix: Admiral of Carrier Division 24, namesake of destroyer USS Mullinnix (DD-944)
 †Irving D. Wiltsie: Captain of Liscome Bay, namesake of destroyer USS Wiltsie (DD-716)
 William J. Woodward Jr.: banker and thoroughbred horse-breeder

See also

 List of United States Navy losses in World War II

Notes

Citations

General sources

Online sources

Bibliography

Further reading
 Beasley, James C. "Get the hell off this ship!": Memoir of a USS Liscome Bay Survivor in World War II, Jefferson: McFarland & Company, 2018. .
 Fahey, James J.  Pacific War Diary: 1942–1945, The Secret Diary of an American Sailor, New York: Houghton Mifflin, 1991. .

External links

 

1943 ships
Casablanca-class escort carriers
Maritime incidents in November 1943
Ships built in Vancouver, Washington
Ships sunk by Japanese submarines
World War II escort aircraft carriers of the United States
World War II shipwrecks in the Pacific Ocean
S4-S2-BB3 ships
Naval magazine explosions